Pentaskhinos is the location of a submarine communications cable system landing point on the island of Cyprus.

The following cable systems land at Pentaskhinos:
MedNautilus
MINERVA
CADMOS
UGARIT

References

Submarine communications cables in the Mediterranean Sea
Geography of Cyprus
Communications in Cyprus